Maria Nazareth Ferreira da Silva is a zoologist from Manaus, Brazil

Da Silva has, for many years, specialised in the study of Amazonian mammals. She has described several new species of rodents:
 Proechimys echinothrix, the Tefe Spiny Rat
 Proechimys gardneri, the Gardner's Spiny Rat
 Proechimys pattoni, the Patton's spiny rat
 Proechimys kulinae, the Kulina spiny rat.

She has written, and contributed to, many papers and articles on the subject, and currently works for the National Institute of Amazonian Research.

Partial list of works

Mammals of the Rio Juruá: Evolutionary and ecological diversification within Amazonia. (with Patton, J.L. and J.R. Malcolm) (pub.2000)  Bull. Amer. Mus. Nat. Hist. 244:1-306
Population Genetic Structure of two ecologically distinct Amazonian Spiny Rats:Separating History and Current Ecology (with Marjorie D. Matocq and James L. Patton)
Definition of Species of Pouched Four-Eyed Opossums (Didelphidae, Philander) (with James L. Patton) Journal of Mammalogy, Vol. 78, No. 1 (Feb., 1997), pp. 90–102
Rivers, Refuges, and Ridges: The Geography of Speciation of Amazonian Mammals (with James L. Patton)

References

Brazilian biologists
Living people
Year of birth missing (living people)